Yiwu Gymnasium is an indoor sporting arena located in Yiwu, Jinhua, Zhejiang, China. The capacity of the arena is 6,000 spectators and opened in 2005.  It hosts indoor sporting events such as basketball and volleyball.  It hosts the Zhejiang Golden Bulls of the Chinese Basketball Association.

References

Indoor arenas in China
Sports venues in Zhejiang